The Woman with Closed Eyes (French: La femme aux yeux fermés) is a 1926 French silent drama film directed by Alexandre Ryder and starring Marise Maia, Jean Lorette and Pierre Stéphen.

Cast
 Marise Maia as Roselyne de Crécy 
 Jean Lorette as Le chauffeur 
 Mme. de Rodde as Madame Hugues 
 Pierre Stéphen as Le jeune homme 
 Nicolas Martin as Le père du jeune homme 
 Nicolas Redelsperger as Monsieur Hugues

References

Bibliography
 Rège, Philippe. Encyclopedia of French Film Directors, Volume 1. Scarecrow Press, 2009.

External links

1926 films
1926 drama films
French drama films
French silent feature films
1920s French-language films
Films based on French novels
Films directed by Alexandre Ryder
French black-and-white films
Silent drama films
1920s French films